Saint Raphael Catholic Church in Koloa is a parish of the Roman Catholic Church of Hawaii in the United States.  Located in Koloa on the island of Kauai, the church falls under the jurisdiction of the Diocese of Honolulu and its bishop.  It is named after Saint Raphael.

The oldest Catholic Church in Kauai, St. Raphael's was founded in 1841 by Father Arsenius Walsh. It was founded two years after Catholics were granted religious freedom in Hawaii after the French threatened Honolulu. The church building was completed in 1854. It was enlarged and renovated in 1936.

References

External links 
 St. Raphael Church website

Roman Catholic churches in Hawaii
Buildings and structures in Kauai County, Hawaii
1841 establishments in Hawaii
Roman Catholic churches completed in 1856
19th-century Roman Catholic church buildings in the United States